The Oath of Henri de Guise is an 1864 history painting by Pierre-Charles Comte, now in the Musée des Beaux-Arts de Lyon. It formed part of the 2014 exhibition L'invention du passé. Histoires de cœur et d'épée en Europe, 1802-1850. It shows Henry I, Duke of Guise as a child.

1864 paintings
History paintings
Paintings in the collection of the Museum of Fine Arts of Lyon
Paintings of children
Cultural depictions of Henry I, Duke of Guise